Canterbury Anifest is an animation festival located in Canterbury. England. Anifest is an annual event that takes place in March and describes itself as "the largest annual event of this kind in the South East". It was founded in 2007 by Canterbury City Council. Industry guests have included Aardman, Double Negative, DreamWorks, LAIKA, Pixar, and The Ray Harryhausen Foundation.  Since 2016, the festival has been run by a group of media lecturers at Canterbury Christ Church University.

Awards
Awards categories include
 Best British film
 Best International Film
 Best Student Film 
 Best Animation
 Best Art Design
 Best Sound
 Audience Award

See also
List of international animation festivals

External links
  Retrieved 12 March 2019

References

Animation film festivals in the United Kingdom
Film festivals in England
Student film festivals
Annual events in England